Sticky Fingers: The Life and Times of Jann Wenner and Rolling Stone Magazine is a 2017 book by Joe Hagan that examines Jann Wenner and the history of Rolling Stone magazine. The book has seven "positive" reviews, nine "rave" reviews, and four "mixed" reviews, according to review aggregator Book Marks.

References

2017 non-fiction books
English-language books
Alfred A. Knopf books
Rolling Stone